Edward Kerr (born October 14, 1966) is an American actor.

Raised in Kansas City, Missouri, he attended Rockhurst High School and Vanderbilt University before deciding to pursue an acting career.

He moved to Hollywood and landed a holding deal at NBC, and starred in two of the network's primetime series, The Secrets of Lake Success and seaQuest DSV and followed by a starring role in the feature film Above Suspicion. He earned critical praise as the lead in the TNT cable feature program, Legalese, and starred in the festival comedy        
Confessions of a Sexist Pig.

Kerr later costarred on the 1999 series Snoops and joined the cast of NBC's comedy series Three Sisters.

He married Michelle Stanford on August 24, 2012. They have a son, Walker Travers Kerr, born on St. Patrick's Day, 2013.

Partial filmography and TV credits 
 The Secrets of Lake Success (1993) (mini) TV Series .... Tony Parrish
 SeaQuest DSV .... Lt. James Brody (27 episodes, 1994–1996)
 Above Suspicion (1995) .... Nick Cain
 Magic Island (1995) (V) .... Prince Morgan
 Touched by an Angel .... Kevin Abernathy (1 episode, 1996)
 Legalese (1998) (TV) .... Roy Guyton
 Confessions of a Sexist Pig (1998) .... Jack
 Snoops (1999) TV Series .... Det. Greg McCormack (unknown episodes)
 The Astronaut's Wife (1999) .... Pilot
 Sex and the City .... Jason (1 episode, 2000)
 Three Sisters .... 'Jake' Jasper G. Riley (10 episodes, 2001–2002)
 Dexter Prep (2002) (TV) .... Jim
 Monk .... Denny Graf (1 episode, 2004)
 What I Like About You .... Rick (15 episodes, 2004–2005)
 CSI: Miami .... Tom Hanford (1 episode, 2005)
 Men in Trees .... Ian Slattery (2 episodes, 2006)
 Close to Home .... Kyle Cantrell (1 episode, 2006)
 Heist .... Det. Roy Thomas (1 episode, 2006)
 You Did What? (2006) .... Charlie Porter
 Freddie .... James (1 episode, 2006)
 House .... Ted (1 episode, 2006)
 Girls on the Bus (1 episode, 2006)
 Ambition To Meaning (Film, 2008) Chad Moore
 Pretty Little Liars ..... Ted Wilson (11 episodes, 2012–2017)
 Hot in Cleveland ..... Rex (1 episode, 2013)
 Lucifer ..... Don Zeikel (1 episode, 2018)
 SEAL Team ..... Captain Edwards (1 episode, 2019)

References

External links

Edward Kerr fansite

1966 births
Living people
Male actors from Missouri
American male film actors
American male television actors
Vanderbilt University alumni